Alessandro Del Vecchio (born 21 April 1979) is an Italian multi-instrumentalist and producer, best known for his collaborations with hard rock and heavy metal artists such as Jørn Lande, Revolution Saints, Hardline, Fergie Frederiksen, Ted Poley, Kelly Keeling and Mat Sinner, and for his work as the in-house producer for Neapolitan record label Frontiers Music SRL from his personal Ivorytears Music Works Studio located just north of Milan.

Biography

Formation

Born and raised in Italy, his career started at a very young age while honing his skills as a singer, songwriter and versatile instrumentalist. Among his many musical accomplishments, Alessandro found himself at the pinnacle of the industry's most difficult processes. Alessandro began indulging in producing, engineering and mastering hundreds of world-class Billboard chart topping albums including a multitude of collaborations from the most sought after rock groups in the world.

Edge of Forever, Moonstone Project and Lionville (2003-2011)

Some of Alessandro's most memorable accomplishments were with famed artists Jeff Scott Soto and Marcel Jacob of Talisman and Malmsteen in 2003. In fact, in 2004, they worked collectively on compositions like Edge of Forever's Feeding The Fire, which also featured Bob Harris from Frank Zappa and Axe and in 2005 on second album Let The Demon Rock And Roll. In 2006 Alessandro was called to sing, play Hammond organ and keyboards in the Moonstone Project first album Time to Take a Stand featuring Kelly Keeling, Graham Bonnet, Glenn Hughes, James Christian, Carmine Appice, Paul Shortino, Steve Walsh, Ian Paice, Tony Franklin and Roberto Tiranti.

In 2009 Alessandro resumed Edge of Forever project without Bob Harris and Marcel Jacob, but with himself on vocals, keyboards and producing and with new line-up released third album Another Paradise. In the same year he was in the Moonstone Project second album Rebel on the Run with artists as Clive Bunker, James Christian, Robin Beck, Roberto Tiranti, Glenn Hughes, Ken Hensley and Ian Paice.

In 2011 he formed Lionville project with Stefano Lionetti and produced and released the eponymous album with collaboration of Swedish singer Lars Säfsund.

Frontiers Records collaboration

Hardline and Mat Sinner (2011-2014)

In 2011 Frontiers Records called Alessandro for third Johnny Gioeli's Hardline reformation and in 2012 he produced, arranged and played their new album Danger Zone with hit "Fever Dreams". In the same year he produced, arranged and played the Lionville second album II. 
In 2013 Alessandro was on keyboards in German guitar player Alex Beyrodt's project Silent Force for Rising from Ashes album in which he started a long date collaboration with German bass player and producer Mat Sinner. In the same year Alessandro collaborated with Toto former singer Fergie Frederiksen for his solo album Any Given Moment.
In 2014 he produced, wrote, recorded, played keyboards, mixed and mastered the eponymous album of supergroup Rated X formed by Joe Lynn Turner, Karl Cochran, Tony Franklin and Carmine Appice.

Revolution Saints, Sunstorm and Jorn (2015-2016)

In January 2015 Frontiers combined the skills of Alessandro with German bass player and producer Mat Sinner for the Level 10 record with Symphony X singer Russell Allen the album Chapter One with Randy Black on drums, Alex Beyrodt and Roland Grapow (ex-Helloween, Masterplan) on guitars.
Alessandro continued his collaboration with Sinner and Beyrodt with David Readman (Pink Cream 69) on vocals and Francesco Jovino on drums on Voodoo Circle album Whisky Fingers released on November.
2015 was an important year for Alessandro because of Revolution Saints' eponymous album with Deen Castronovo, Doug Aldrich and Jack Blades. This album received important international feedbacks and was acclaimed for Alessandro production and songwriting, particularly for the hit "Back of My Trail". In the same yeah Alessandro worked for supergroup Resurrection Kings (formed by Chas West, Craig Goldy, Sean McNabb and Vinny Appice) for eponymous album and for Kelly Keeling with the album Mind Radio. 
In 2016 Frontiers entrusted to Alessandro Joe Lynn Turner's project Sunstorm for new production, keyboards and songwriting after Dennis Ward three-albums era. He called on guitar Simone Mularoni of DGM, on bass guitar Nik Mazzucconi of Labyrinth and Edge of Forever and on drums Francesco Jovino of Hardline, Primal Fear, Voodoo Circle and Edge of Forever. On May they released Edge of Tomorrow. In the same year Alessandro started collaboration with Norwegian metal singer Jorn and he produced and played keyboards on cover album Heavy Rock Radio. In October he released with Hardline's Human Nature album.

Other productions and Edge of Forever return (2017-2020)
 
In 2017 Mat Sinner asked Alessandro to become one of the singers of the massive production of "The Original Rock Meets Classic", featuring the likes of Don Felder, Steve Lukather, Rick Springfield, Francis Rossi among many others. On June he wrote, produced, recorded, played keyboards on, mixed and mastered the new Jorn album Life on Death Road with musicians of the Voodoo Circle's Whisky Fingers Mat Sinner on bass guitar, Alex Beyrodt on guitars and Francesco Jovino on drums. On September Alessandro was involved as producer, session musician, songwriter and sound engineer for Kee of Hearts' eponymous album, a project with German singer Tommy Heart (Fair Warning), Swedish virtuoso guitar player Kee Marcello (ex-Europe), Swedish bass guitar player Ken Sandin (Alien) and Italian drummer Marco Di Salvia (Pino Scotto). On October Revolution Saints released their second album Light in the Dark under complete artistic supervision of Alessandro. In the same year he mixed and mastered the Lionville third album A World of Fools not as band member.
In 2018 Alessandro was active with House of Lords singer James Christian for his solo album Craving as producer and sound engineer. On June Sunstorm returned with the new The Road to Hell with Edo Sala on drums (Folkstone) and on July he produced, wrote, played keyboards on, recorded, mixed and mastered Set The World On Fire for Johnny Gioeli and Deen Castronovo project, both on vocals. On September Alessandro was involved in the new project called Dream Child with Argentinian singer Diego Valdez, Craig Goldy on and Wayne Findlay on guitars, Rudy Sarzo on bass guitar and Simon Wright on drums for the album Until Death Do We Meet Again. On December produced, played keyboards, recorded and engineered on Johnny Gioeli first solo album called One Voice.
In 2019 guitar player and producer Roy Z called Alessandro to play keyboards as session on supergroup Spirits of Fire's eponymous album with musicians as Tim Owens on vocals, Chris Caffery on guitars, Steve Di Giorgio on bass guitar and Mark Zonder on drums. On March Jeff Pilson and George Lynch (with Robert Mason and Mick Brown) called Alessandro to mix and master The End Machine's eponymous album. In the same mouth Alessandro produced, mixed and mastered Burning Rain fourth album Face the Music with Doug Aldrich on guitars, Keith St. Jones on vocals, Brad Lang on bass guitar and Blas Elias on drums. On April Hardline released their new album called Life with new Italian musicians Mario Percudani on guitar and Marco Di Salvia on drums. On May Alessandro recorded for Lords of Black Spanish guitar player the Restless Spirits' eponymous album with collaboration of Johnny Gioeli, Diego Valdez, Dino Jelusić and Deen Castronovo. On June Jorn released live album Live on Death Road with Alessandro on production, keyboards and engineering. On December Alessandro returned with Edge of Forever and their album Native Soul. The new line-up is formed by Nik Mazzucconi on bass guitar (formerly in Another Paradise), Aldo Lonobile (Secret Sphere) on guitar and Marco Di Salvia on drums, respectively instead of Walter Galiaro and Francesco Jovino. In the same mouth Alessandro (writing, producing, recording, playing bass guitar and keyboards on, mixing and mastering) released Lovekillers' eponymous album featuring TNT singer Tony Harnell.
In 2020 Alessandro returned with Revolution Saints that recorded Rise in collaboration with Dan Rossall on songwriting. In the same day Jorn released Heavy Rock Radio II: Executing The Classics with Alessandro on producing, recording, keyboards, engineering and Dirty Shirley (Dino Jelusic on vocals, George Lynch on guitars, Trevor Roxx on bass and Will Hunt on drums) released their eponymous album with Alessandro on producing, recording, mixing and mastering. On February Alessandro was involved with mixing and mastering of supergroup Black Swan's Shake the World and with new Hardline live Life: Live.

Discography

References

1979 births
Living people
Italian musicians
Italian heavy metal singers